Middle Egyptian: An Introduction to the Language and Culture of Hieroglyphs, a book first published in 2000, provides a thorough and up-to-date introduction to the Ancient Egyptian language and hieroglyphic writing system. The book is authored by James P. Allen, who was the Curator of Egyptian Art at the Metropolitan Museum of Art in New York.

References
Allen, James P., Middle Egyptian, An Introduction to the Language and Culture of Hieroglyphs, c 2000, Cambridge University Press. (softcover)

Modern Egyptian hieroglyphs books